Madhabi Chakraborty (née Mukherjee; born 10 February 1942) is an Indian actress. She won the National Film Award for Best Actress for her performance in the Bengali film Dibratrir Kabya. She has acted in some of the most critically acclaimed films in Bengali cinema and is considered one of the great actresses of Bengali cinema.

Early life
Madhabi Mukherjee was born on 10 February 1942 and was raised with her sister Manjari by their mother in Kolkata, in what was then Bengal, India. As a young girl, she became involved in the theater.

She worked on stage with doyens such as Sisir Bhaduri, Ahindra Choudhury, Nirmalendu Lahiri and Chhabi Biswas. Some of the plays she acted in included Naa and Kalarah. She made her film debut as a child artist in Premendra Mitra's Dui beaee.

Films
Mukherjee first made a major impact with Mrinal Sen's Baishey Shravan (Wedding Day) in 1960. The film is set in a Bengal village before and during the horrific famine of 1943 in Bengal that saw over 5 million die. Mukherjee plays a 16-year-old girl who marries a middle-aged man. Initially, she brightens his life but then World War II and the Bengal Famine hits them. The couple's marriage disintegrates.

Her next major film was Ritwik Ghatak's Subarnarekha (The Golden Thread ) made in 1962, but released in 1965 – the last in a trilogy examining the socio-economic implications of partition, the other two being Meghe Dhaka Tara (The Cloud-Capped Star) (1960) and Komal Gandhar (E-Flat) (1961). In the film, Ghatak depicts the economic and socio-political crisis of Bengal from 1948 to 1962; how the crisis has first and foremost left one bereft of one's conscience. Mukherjee plays Sita, the younger sister of Ishwar (Abhi Bhattacharya), who kills herself when—as a prostitute waiting for her first customer—she finds out the customer is none other than her estranged brother.

Working with Satyajit Ray
In the early 1960s, she was recruited by Satyajit Ray to portray the role of Arati in the 1963 film Mahanagar (The Big City).

Recalling her meeting with Ray, Mukherjee wrote:

In Mahanagar, Mukherjee plays Arati, who takes a job as a saleswoman due to financial constraints in the family. The large joint family is horrified at the thought of a working woman. For Arati, going door to door selling knitting machines opens up a whole new world and new friends and acquaintances, including an Anglo-Indian friend, Edith. Earning money also raises Arati's status in the family especially when her husband (Anil Chatterjee) loses his job. When Edith is sacked unfairly, Arati resigns in protest...Mukherjee's towering performance as Arati dominates the film. Film critic Roger Ebert wrote: "It might be useful to see the performance of Madhabi Mukherjee in this film. She is a beautiful deep, wonderful actress who simply surpasses all ordinary standards of judgment."

This film was followed by her portrayals of Charu in Charulata (The Lonely Wife), the 1964 film based on Rabindranath Tagore's novella Nashtanir (The Broken Nest, 1901). Mukherjee's stunning portrayal of Charulata, a bored and neglected housewife of Calcutta in the 19th century, is a towering performance in the history of Indian cinema.

Mukherjee reached the peak of her career with this film. It is said that when Ray returned to Tagore with Ghare Baire (1984) (The Home and the World), he stylised Swatilekha Chatterjee in a manner similar to Madhabi in Charulata.
 
Mukherjee's third and last film with Ray was Kapurush (The Coward) in 1965. The film looks at Amitabha Roy (Soumitra Chatterjee), a screenwriter whose car breaks down in a small town. He lodges with a local resident, Bimal Gupta (Haradhan Bannerjee). Bimal is married to Karuna (Mukherjee), who was a former girlfriend of Amitabha, a fact of which Bimal is unaware.

After Satyajit Ray
Although she remained a big star in the Bengali commercial film industry, after Kapurush, Mukherjee failed to reach the critical heights as her films with Ritwik Ghatak and Satyajit Ray again.

Her major films after Kapurush include Calcutta 71 in 1972 by Mrinal Sen, Biraj Bou in 1972 by Manu Sen, Strir Patra in 1972 by Purnendu Patri, Ganadevata  in 1978 by Tarun Majumdar, Bancharamer Bagan in 1980 by Tapan Sinha, Chokh in 1982, Chhandaneer in 1989 by Utpalendu Chakrabarty and Utsab in 2000 by Rituparno Ghosh.

Personal life
Mukherjee is married to Bengali film actor Nirmal Kumar. They have two daughters, but are currently separated.

She wrote her autobiography Ami Madhabi in 1995.

Filmography
 Aabesh (2021)
 Borunbabur Bondhu (2019)
 Kushumitar Gappo (2018)
 Bakita Byaktigato (2013)
 Hing Ting Chot (2010)
 Mayer Adar (2002)
 Utsab (2000) as Bhagabati 
 Rangin Basanta (1995)
 Artikram (1994)
 Prithibir Shesh Station (1993)
 Mon Mane Na (1993) as Dipak's mother
 Daan Pratidaan (1992)
 Antarer Bhalobasha (1991)
 Agni Trishna (1989)
 Chandaneer (1989)
 Kari Diye Kinlam (1989)
 Aghaton Ajo Ghatey (1989)
 Anjali (1988)
 Ekti Jiban (1988)
 Hirer Shikal (1988)
 Pratikar (1987)
 Uttar Lipi (1986)
 Anurager Choa (1986)
 Bhalobasa Bhalobasa (1985)
 Putulghar (1985)
 Jog Biyog (1984)
 Samapti (1983)
 Chhoto Maa (1983)
 Chokh (1983)
 Matir Swarga (1982)
 Prafulla (1982)
 Subarnalata (1981)
 Manikchand (1981) as Baroboudi
 Saheb (1981)
 Bancharamer Bagan (1980) as Chhakari's wife
 Ganadevata (1979) as Padma
 Yugo Manab Kabir (1976)
 Phool Sajya (1975)
 Natun Surya (1975)
 Agnishwar (1975)
 Bindur Chheley (1973) as Bindubasini
 Bon Palashir Padabali (1973)
 Strir Patra (1972)
 Chinna Patra (1972)
 Biraj Bou (1972)
 Jiban Rahasya (1972)
 Calcutta 71 (1971)
 Chhadmabeshi (1971) as Sulekha
 Samantaral (1970)
 Duranta Charai (1969)
 Adwitiya (1968)
 Garh Nasimpur (1968)
 Chhotto Jignasa (1968)
 Kheya (1967)
 Ajana Shapath  (1967)
 Shankhabela (1966)
 Swapna Niye (1966)
 Joradighir Chowdhury Paribar (1966)
 Kapurush (1965) as Karuna Gupta
 Ghoom Bhangar Gaan (1965)
 Subarnarekha (1965) as Sita
 Thana Theke Aschi (1965)
 Godhuli Belaye (1964)
 Binsati Janani (1964)
 Charulata (1964) as Charulata
 Mahanagar (1963) as Arati Mazumder
 Aaj Kal Parshu (1961)
 Baishey Shravana (1960)
 Tonsil (1956)
 Kankantala Light Railway (1950)

Television

 Ishti Kutum
 Hiyar Majhe
 Kusum Dola
 Gachkouto
 Nokshi Kantha
 Sanyasi Raja

Awards and nominations
 2017: WBFJA Lifetime Achievement Award
 2014: Filmfare East Lifetime achievement award
 1970: National Film Award for Best Actress for Dibratrir Kabya
 1965: BFJA Award for Best Actress for Charulata
 1966: BFJA Award for Best Actress for Dholgobinder Karcha
 1967: BFJA Award for Best Actress Award for Joradighir Chowdhury Paribar
 1971: BFJA Award for Best Actress Award for Dibaratir Kabya
 2012: Kalakar Awards
 2022: ABP Ananda Sera Bangali Award (Lifetime Achievement)

References

Citations

Sources
Mukherjee, Madhabi. My Life, My Love: An Autobiography. Palo Alto: The Stanford Theatre Foundation, 1999.

External links
 

1943 births
Living people
Actresses from Kolkata
Indian film actresses
Actresses in Bengali cinema
Kalakar Awards winners
Best Actress National Film Award winners
20th-century Indian actresses